Old Fields is an unincorporated community on the South Branch Potomac River in northern Hardy County, West Virginia, United States.

According to the Geographic Names Information System, Old Fields has also been known throughout its history as Indian Old Field, Indian Old Fields, and Oldfields. Also, as "Fort Pleasant," a French and Indian War fort built on the Van Meter land at Old Fields.

History
The community was named for the fact the original town site was an Indian old field.

Other buildings of interest in the vicinity include Old Fields Church (1812; the second-oldest church in West Virginia), Fort Pleasant, the Isaac Van.Meter House built in the 1810's, the Garrett Van Meter House (1835), 
Willow Wall (1812), Buena Vista (1836), built for William T. Van Meter (killed in Gen. Wade Hampton’s “Beefsteak Raid” behind Union lines near Petersburg, Virginia, in 1864), Traveler’s Rest (1856; constructed for Garrett Van Meter’s three unmarried sisters: Ann, Rebecca, and Susan), and the Peter Casey house, where George Washington spent the night as a boy on his surveying trip for Lord Fairfax in 1748.

References

Unincorporated communities in Hardy County, West Virginia
Populated places on the South Branch Potomac River
Unincorporated communities in West Virginia